Mickey Lund (born 21 August 1972) is a Danish cricketer. He is a right-handed batsman and a leg-break bowler. He played in the ICC Trophy for Denmark in 1997 and 2001, debuting against Malaysia in March 1997.

Lund started his career as an opening batsman for the Danish team, slowly making his way down the upper order as his international career progressed. He participated in the 2002 European Championship for his country, and in one match in the C&G Trophy competition of 2005.

Most recently, Lund played for Denmark in Division Two of the ICC World Cricket League in 2007.

External links
Mickey Lund at CricketArchive 

1972 births
Danish cricketers
Living people
Sportspeople from Frederiksberg